"Stop to Start" is a 1973 song by Blue Magic from their eponymous debut album. The single peaked at No. 74 on the Billboard Hot 100, #14 on the R&B chart, and #59 in Canada.

"Stop to Start" was written by James Grant and Allan Felder and produced by Norman Harris.

References

1973 singles
1973 songs
Blue Magic (band) songs
Songs written by Allan Felder
Songs written by Norman Harris (musician)